Richard Oliver Furch is an American music engineer, mixer, and pianist.  He has worked with many prominent names in music, including: Usher, Prince, Boyz II Men, Macy Gray, Ruben Studdard, Chaka Khan,  India.Arie, and Tyrese, as well as Chinese recording artists, JJ Lin, Tanya Chua, Wang Leehom, Jolin Tsai, and G.E.M. amongst many others.

He has engineered and mixed music on multiple Grammy Award nominated and Grammy Award winning albums.

Richard attended the SAE Institute in Berlin where he began studying music engineering and mixing. He attended Berklee College of Music and earned his bachelor's degree in music production and engineering. Rather than returning to Berlin Richard moved to New York where he began engineering at Sound On Sound recording studio where he worked with such acts as Outkast, Jay-Z, Usher, Edwin McCain, and Fountains of Wayne
Outkast won a Grammy Award for Album Of The Year for their album Speakerboxxx/The Love Below which Richard engineered parts of in 2003.

Product Endorsements
Apogee
McDSP
Exponential Audio
Metric Halo
Arturia 
Sound radix

Billboard Music Charts Recognition

Richard received Billboard Award plaques in recognition for his work on mixing Prince's, LotusFlow3r Record, released in 2008, which peaked at #1 for top R&B/Hip-Hop albums on April 18, 2009.

Albums Mixed and Engineered with Grammy Awards and Nominations 

|-
|  || Tyrese "Shame" || Best Traditional R&B Performance || 
|-
|  || Tyrese "Shame" || Best R&B Song || 
|-
|  || Charlie Wilson "Forever Charlie" || Best R&B Album || 
|-
|  || TGT "Three Kings" || Best R&B Album || 
|-
|  || Chrisette Michele Better || Best R&B Album || 
|-
|  || Tyrese "Open Invitation" || Best R&B Album || 
|-
|  || Prince "Dreamer" || Best Solo Rock Vocal Performance || 
|- 
|  || Chaka Khan "Funk This" || Best R&B Album || 
|-
|  || Usher "Confessions" || Best Contemporary R&B Album || 
|-
|  || The Brooklyn Tabernacle Choir "Live...This Is Your House" || Best Gospel Choir Or Chorus Album ||  
|-
|  || Speakerboxxx "The Love Below" || Album Of The Year || 
|-
|  || Fountains Of Wayne Stacy's Mom || Best Pop Performance By A Duo Or Group With Vocal || 
|-
|  || The Brooklyn Tabernacle Choir "Light Of The World || Best Gospel Choir Or Chorus Album || 
|-
|  || Marcus Miller "M²" || Best Contemporary Jazz Album ||

Selected Discography

Music Mixing in Film Scoring

References

External links

Living people
Year of birth missing (living people)
People from Hamelin
German expatriates in the United States
German audio engineers
Audio production engineers
Berklee College of Music alumni
Engineers from Lower Saxony